Ștefan Răzvan (died December 1595) was a Voivode (Prince) of Moldavia (between 24 April 1595 and August 1595) of paternal side Muslim Roma descent from the historical state of Wallachia.

Biography
The father of Ștefan Răzvan was a Muslim Roma from the Ottoman Empire who emigrated north of Danube, in Wallachia, while his mother was a Romanian peasant from the new country of settlement. At that time, all the Romani people living in the Romanian states of Wallachia and Moldavia were slaves. The rule was applied also to any Romani immigrants, excepting the Muslim Ottoman citizens. Benefiting of this exception, the father and later the son could remain free and become an active part in the local society.

Ștefan Răzvan appears as a political player at the beginning of Michael the Brave's rule in Wallachia (1593–1601), as a close noble ally of the Wallachian Prince. He previously converted from Islam to Christianity, attracting the wrath of the Ottoman Turks. He had the boyar social status and he was a cultured person. Later, he becomes involved in the politics of the neighbouring Romanian country of Moldavia, where he was appointed as part of the Princely council, with the title of  hatman (second in rank in the army after the Prince), during the reign of Aaron the Tyrant. He led the campaigns of the Moldavian army against Tighina, Chilia, Cetatea Albă and Northern Dobruja, then occupied by the Ottomans. Ștefan became very popular among the soldiers and, with their support and with the help of the Transylvanian Prince Sigismund Báthory, he ousted Aaron the Tyrant (whose image was eroded among the population), on 24 April 1595.

His leadership did not last long, because the neighboring political power, the Polish–Lithuanian Commonwealth did not agree with Ștefan Răzvan's alliance with Transylvania and Wallachia. They invaded Moldavia in August, bringing Ieremia Movilă as the Prince accepted by the Poles. The decisive battle was on the Suceava's plains (on 3 December 1595), concluded, after three hours of fight, with the Polish victory. Ștefan fled towards Transylvania, but he was captured and impaled.

References

Bibliography
Istoria și tradițiile minorității rromani, p. 28, 2005, Sigma, Bucharest, Delia Grigore, Petre Petcuț and Mariana Sandu

External links

Converts to Eastern Orthodoxy from Islam
Romanian Romani people
Romani Christians
Romani politicians
Rulers of Moldavia
1595 deaths
Year of birth unknown
Romanian former Muslims
People executed by impalement
People of the Long Turkish War